The Hawaii Cryptologic Center (HCC) or NSA Hawaii is a U.S. National Security Agency (NSA) Central Security Service (CSS) facility located near Wahiawa on the island of Oahu, Hawaii. The facility opened on January 6, 2012, at a cost of $358 million. The center focuses on signals intelligence intercepts from Asia, and conducts cybersecurity and cyberwarfare operations.

In May 2013, a worker at this facility, Edward Snowden, took many classified documents and provided them to the press, revealing the existence of a number of top secret NSA mass surveillance programs.

See also
 Kunia Regional SIGINT Operations Center
 European Cryptologic Center
 Colorado Cryptologic Center
 Georgia Cryptologic Center
 Texas Cryptologic Center
 Navy Information Operations Command, Hawaii

References

National Security Agency facilities
Buildings and structures in Honolulu County, Hawaii